Depressaria heydenii is a moth of the family Depressariidae. It is found in France, Germany, Switzerland, Austria, Italy, Slovakia, Poland and Romania. It is an alpine species.

The larvae have been recorded feeding on Heracleum juranum, Heracleum austriacum, Heracleum sphondylium, Meum athamanticum and Laserpitium latifolium. Young larvae are bright green with yellow length lines and a black head. Older larvae are darker green.

References

Moths described in 1854
Depressaria
Moths of Europe